James Bower (26 January 1860 – 16 May 1921) was born to Irish immigrants in Upper Canada.  

Bower became a successful farmer and farm leader in western Canada. He served for a time as president of the Canadian Council of Agriculture.

References 

 

1860 births
1921 deaths
Canadian farmers
Canadian people of Irish descent